1897 in Argentine football saw Lomas win its 4th Primera División championship within 5 seasons played. Lomas won the title after winning the 2nd replay of the playoff against Lanús Athletic. The players of Lomas Academy (dissolved last year) returned to the main team.

Lanús A.C., Banfield and Palermo A.C. debuted while Belgrano A.C. registered a "B" team.

Primera división

Final standings

Championship Playoffs

References

 
Seasons in Argentine football
, Argentine
1897 in South American football